Tropidoderus is a genus of phasmids belonging to the family Phasmatidae.

The species of this genus are found in Australia.

Species:

Tropidoderus childrenii 
Tropidoderus exiguus 
Tropidoderus gracilifemur 
Tropidoderus michaelseni 
Tropidoderus prasina 
Tropidoderus rhodomus 
Tropidoderus viridis

References

Phasmatidae
Phasmatodea genera